Lico is an unincorporated community and coal town in Kanawha County, West Virginia, United States. It was also known as Meisters and Sequio. Its post office  is closed.

References 

Unincorporated communities in West Virginia
Unincorporated communities in Kanawha County, West Virginia
Coal towns in West Virginia